Bread (Hebrew: לחם, tr.

Synopsis
The film follows Shlomo Elmaliach, who loses his job at his town's local bakery when it is forced to close. Rather than join the other unemployed protesters, Elmaliach locks himself in his own home and launches a very personal hunger strike. Gradually, even Elmaliach's own friends abandon him, and he ends up dragging his own family down with him. A son, Baruch (Moshe Ivgy), seeks radical solutions to poverty, while a daughter, Navah (Etti Ankri, who also sings), who has escaped to Tel Aviv-Yafo to study, returns to her home and takes on a job on a production line, and Elmaliach's wife, Mazal, takes on a job as a seamstress. At the end of the film, the factory is reopened as a result of all of the protests, however, by then it is too late for Shlomo Elmaliach.

Reception

The journalist  has compared the film to the works of Alain Resnais, Chris Marker, Agnès Varda, and Michelangelo Antonioni and has opined that it “is still very powerful, and it seems as relevant today as it was on the day it was first aired.” All five films were released in Israel as part of a limited edition DVD boxset in 2009.

References

External links

 (Israeli Public Broadcasting Corporation Channel) 

1986 television films
1986 films
1980s political comedy-drama films
Comedy-drama television films
Films about dysfunctional families
Films about labor relations
Films about old age
Films about poverty
Films about prejudice
Films about racism
Films about royalty
Films about social class
Films about television people
Films about the Israel Defense Forces
Films about the labor movement
Films shot in Israel
Films shot in the State of Palestine
1980s Hebrew-language films
Israeli comedy-drama films
Poverty in television
Racism in television
Channel 1 (Israel) original programming
Television shows set in Israel
Unemployment in fiction
Works about classism